Donegal County Council is the authority responsible for local government in County Donegal, Ireland. As a county council, it is governed by the Local Government Act 2001. The council is responsible for housing and community, roads and transportation, urban planning and development, amenity and culture, and environment. It has 37 elected members. Elections are held every five years and are by single transferable vote. The head of the council has the title of Cathaoirleach (Chairperson). The county administration is headed by a Chief Executive, John McLaughlin. The county town is Lifford.

History
Donegal County Council, which had previously held its meetings in Lifford Courthouse, acquired County House in Lifford for use as its meeting place and administrative headquarters in 1930.

The d'Hondt method has been deployed by Donegal County Council since 2009 and has worked on all but Budget Day, leading Martin Harley (running mate of Joe McHugh at the 2020 general election) to suggest it be used to help form a government.

Following the 2015 RTÉ programme Standards in Public Office, in March 2019, John O'Donnell was found by the Standards in Public Office Commission to have contravened the Local Government Act in three different instances, including failure to maintain proper standards of integrity, conduct and concern for the public interest.

Local Electoral Areas and Municipal Districts
Donegal County Council is divided into the following municipal districts and local electoral areas, defined by electoral divisions.

Current councillors
The following were elected at the 2019 Donegal County Council election, under the boundaries which existed at the time.

Councillors by electoral area
This list reflects the order in which councillors were elected on 24 May 2019.

Notes

Co-options

References

External links

Politics of County Donegal
County councils in the Republic of Ireland